John Richard Knight (December 26, 1929 – March 25, 1991) was an American professional golfer.

Knight was born in Omaha, Nebraska. He played college golf at Oklahoma A&M.

Knight work as a club pro in Hawaii, where he won the Hawaiian Open and Hawaiian PGA Championship in 1952, in San Diego, California, and at Field Club of Omaha in Omaha, Nebraska. He also played on the PGA Tour. His best finish in a major was 10th at the 1959 U.S. Open. He opened the tournament with a 69 to tie for the lead with Ben Hogan, Dow Finsterwald, and Gene Littler.

Knight died in California of lung cancer. A United States Navy veteran during the Korean War, he was buried in Riverside National Cemetery.

Amateur
1950 Nebraska Amateur

Professional wins
1952 Hawaiian Open, Hawaiian PGA Championship
1956 Arizona Open
1958 California State Open, Northern California Open
1960 Iowa Open

References

External links
 

American male golfers
PGA Tour golfers
Golfers from Nebraska
United States Navy sailors
Deaths from lung cancer in California
Burials at Riverside National Cemetery
Sportspeople from Omaha, Nebraska
1929 births
1991 deaths